Ramzi Aburedwan (Arabic:, born 1979) is a Palestinian composer, arranger, educator; and viola and buzuq player. He is the founder of Ensemble Dal’Ouna and the Palestine National Ensemble of Arabic Music. He founded the al Kamandjâti music centre and has collaborated with international and renowned musicians. He first studied at the Edward Said National Conservatory of Music and then in the Regional Conservatory of Angers (France). Documentaries have been made of his life, including Its Not a Gun (2005) and Just Play (2012). He is the main subject of the book Children of the Stone: The Power of Music in a Hard Land by Sandy Tolan (2015).

Biography
Aburedwan was born in Bethlehem in 1979 and raised in the Am'ari refugee camp in Ramallah.

As an eight-year-old he participated in the first intifada and became an inspiration due to a widely circulated photograph showing him poised to throw a stone at a tank. He lost a brother, a cousin, and many of his friends during the intifada.

In October 2002 he founded Al Kamandjâti ("the violinist") Association, which aims to bring classical music to impoverished Palestinian children.

In 2010 he founded the Palestine National Ensemble of Arabic Music, a 30-member ensemble which performs classical Arabic music and original compositions.

In 2012 he released his solo album, Reflections of Palestine, described by David Maine as folk-inflected instrumental music.

The different projects of Ramzi Aburedwan

The Palestine National Ensemble for Arabic Music (PNEAM) 
Created in 2010 by Aburedwan, who also serves as its musical director, The Palestine National Ensemble for Arabic Music (PNEAM) is reviving and breathing new life into the classical Arab musical heritage in Palestine. The 25-30 members of the ensemble, hailing from all parts of historic Palestine—including Ramallah, Jenin, Haifa, Nazareth, Tulkarem, Nablus, and the refugee camps Al Amari, Arrub and Al Fawwar—provide a tangible symbol of Palestinian unity and opportunities for young, talented Palestinian musicians to develop their talent. Through live performances, it renders classical Arabic music traditions accessible to Palestinian audiences of all walks of life.

Dal'Ouna Ensemble 
Ramzi founded Dal’Ouna in 2000, while living in Angers, thus laying the base for a Franco-Arab fusion band that also reflects Aburedwan’s personal and musical voyage. Dal’ouna’s core members include Ramzi on bouzouq and viola, Ziad Ben Youssef (Tunisia/France) on oud and percussion, Edwin Buger (ex-Yugoslavia/France) on accordion and keys, and Tareq Rentisi (Palestine) on percussion. The band has toured in Europe, the Middle East, the Gulf countries and the United States. But it is in Palestine that the band tours most often, bringing its message to Palestinian cities, villages and refugee camps, and mentoring young performers who they invite to join their performances.

The ensemble has released four albums. Dal’Ouna’s latest album (Reflections of Palestine, World Music Network 2012), featuring Aburedwan’s compositions, was the winner of the 2012 Indie Acoustic Project (IAP) in the World Music category.

The new repertoire Dal'Ouna is paying tribute to Ramzi's ancestors, the Natufians.

Al Manara Ensemble 
Al Manara (meaning The Beacon) is a Belgian-Palestinian ensemble built on the collaborative juices and musical dialogue occurring between Aburedwan and the Belgian pianist, conductor and composer Éloi Baudimont. The pair was introduced by Yanic Samzun, Secretary General of Cultural Presence and Action, who viewed the two artists as possessing both great passion and the ability to cross musical boundaries. The repertoire builds on Ramzi’s and Éloi’s compositions, poems of Mahmoud Darwish, and an East-West blending of Palestinian melodies, European polyphony, big-band harmonies, Arabic and European instruments, and historic and contemporary influences that have taken Ramzi into an exploration of the possibilities brought to life by the bouzouq. The ensemble has toured France, Belgium and Palestine and has released one CD.

Jerusalem Sufi Ensemble 
The Jerusalem Sufi Ensemble is dedicated to the documentation and revival of Sufi traditions in the city that for centuries has provided a home and inspiration to these traditions. Its members are documenting the endangered local Sufi heritage, but are also broadening the tradition by including classical and folkloric repertoire from Palestine and the Arab worldalong withoriginal compositions. The ensemble features Palestine-based muezzins along with instrumental fusions of Arabic and Sufi traditions. The voice-centered tradition is here enhanced by an ensemble that includes bouzouq, oud, qanun, nay and percussion.The ensemble’s current performance project, titled “Forgiveness,” explores an international body of Sufi poetry that includes Mansur Al-Hallaj (Persia), Muhammed Ibn-Arabi (Andalusia), Jalal Ad-Din Muhammad Rumi (Persia), Imam Al-Busiri (Morocco & Egypt), Baha-ud-Din Naqshband Bukhari (Bukhara) and Ibn Al-Farid (Syria & Egypt) among others.

Arab-Andalusian Orchestra from Anjou 
Conducted by Aburedwan, the Arab-Andalusian Orchestra is made up of artists from all over Anjou, of all ages, in an intergenerational and multicultural dynamic. They have a repertoire ranging from the Levant (Middle East) to Eastern Europe via Africa and Asia. It is above all the compositions of the members of the orchestra that gradually constitutes the repertoire. The themes addressed revolve around the Andalusian lyrical imagination, and are conveyed through courtly love, wine, and gardens.

Other projets 
Aburedwan has composed and arranged for orchestra for the World Sacred music festival of Fes under the artistic direction of Alain Weber in 2016, 2017, 2018, 2019 and 2022. These pluri-disciplinary creations are presented at the opening of the festival. 

Aburedwan is also the music director of two performances presented at the Philharmonie of Paris: "Tribute to the Great Divas", featuring songs from Oum Kalsoum, Fairouz, Asmahan, Leila Mourad, Mayada Alhenawy, Warda al Djazaïra, and "Ma valise est mon pays", tribute to the poet Mahmoud Darwich with on stage Kamilya Jubran, Rodolphe Burger and Rachida Brakni.

Discography
 Reflections of Palestine (2012)
 Marvels of the Arab world (Live) (2018)

Further reading
 S. Tolan, Children of the Stone:The Power of Music in a Hard Land, Bloomsbury, 2015.

References

External links
 Official site
 Official al Kamandjâti site
 Photograph of Ramzi as an eight-year-old 
 Palestine National Ensemble of Arabic Music
 Youtube channel

Living people
Palestinian violinists
Palestinian violists
Palestinian composers
Oud players
People from Bethlehem
1979 births
Palestinian musicians
21st-century violinists